Centro Recreativo e Cultural da Quinta dos Lombos  is a sports club based in the village of Quinta dos Lombos, Portugal. The futsal team of Quinta dos Lombos plays in the Portuguese Futsal First Division.

Futsal

Current squad

Former players
 Sandro Azenha (2013–2017)
 Cautela (2011–12)
 Hélder Fernandes (2010–11)
 Marco Mateus (2016–2017)
 Erick Mendonça (2007–12 and 2015–16)
 Hugo Neves (2019–20 and 2020–21)
 Gonçalo Portugal (2016)

References

External links
 Official website
 Zerozero

Futsal clubs in Portugal